Georgenthal is a municipality in Germany.

Georgenthal may also refer to:

Places in the Czech Republic
Sankt Georgenthal, German name of the Czech city Jiřetín pod Jedlovou
Obergeorgenthal, German name for the Czech municipality Horní Jiřetín

Places in Poland
Georgenthal, German name for the Polish village Jurki, Ostróda County
Georgental, German name for the Polish settlement of Urwitałt

See also
Český Jiřetín, known in German as Georgendorf